Louis Arbessier (9 April 190723 March 1998) was a French film and television actor. He played Napoleon III in the 1952 musical film Imperial Violets. Amongst his television roles was that of Maigret.

Arbessier was married and divorced four times, and had four children born between 1929 and 1964. His youngest son, Arnaud (born 1964), is a professional voice actor.

Selected filmography

 Les petits riens (1942)
  (1948) - L'administrateur
 Suzanne and the Robbers (1949) - Docteur Vinson
 Thirst of Men (1950) - Collet
 We Are All Murderers (1952) - L'avocat du tribunal pour enfants
  (1952) - Valise
 Imperial Violets (1952) - Napoléon III
 Mandat d'amener (1953) - M. Delanglade
 The Three Musketeers (1953) - Louis XIII
 Royal Affairs in Versailles (1954) - Louis XIII (uncredited)
 Cadet Rousselle (1954) - Le tribun
 La bella Otero (1954) - Le directeur du Café de Paris
 Queen Margot (1954) - L'amiral de Coligny
 Série noire (1955) - Le commissaire Lefranc
 Napoléon (1955) - Le maréchal Louis Berthier (uncredited)
 If Paris Were Told to Us (1956) - Louis XIII (uncredited)
  (1956) - Le président de la Cour
 Michel Strogoff (1956) - Tsar Alexandre II
 Action immédiate (1957) - Le Colonel
 Les Louves (1957) - Le commissaire de police Drouin
  (1957) - Me Rodier
  (1958) - Le chirurgien Bailleul
 Les Misérables (1958) - Le préfet 
 Women's Prison (1958) - Le directeur de la prison
 One Life (1958) - Monsieur Dandieu
  (1959) - Le juge
 Ce soir on tue (1959) - Interpol Man #3
  (1960) - Le professeur
 Liberty Bar (1960) - Maigret
 Captain Blood (1960) - (uncredited)
 The Truth (1960) - Le professeur
 The President (1961) - Jussieu
 Âme qui vive (1961)
 Le Miracle des loups (1961) - Comte Hesselin
 The Lions Are Loose (1961) - Frédéric Moine
 The Reluctant Spy (1963) - Le directeur du musée
 The Great Spy Chase (1964) - The Swiss colonel
 The Dirty Game (1965) - Ivanov
 La corde au cou (1965) - L'avocat
 God's Thunder (1965) - Bricard, le ministre
 To Skin a Spy (1966) - Le colonel
 Pasha (1968) - Le directeur chez Boucheron
  (1969) - Le ministre
 Under the Sign of the Bull (1969) - Aupagneur
 Sapho ou la Fureur d'aimer (1971) - M. Monestier
 The Lion's Share (1971) - Cornille - l'éditeur
 La michetonneuse (1972) - Le père de Justine
 Charlotte (1974) - Le père du Charlotte
 Mesrine (1984) - Lelièvre

References

Bibliography
 Goble, Alan. The Complete Index to Literary Sources in Film. Walter de Gruyter, 1999.

External links

1907 births
1998 deaths
French male film actors